LOVE Park, officially known as  John F. Kennedy Plaza, is a public park located in Center City, Philadelphia, Pennsylvania. The park is nicknamed LOVE Park for its reproduction of Robert Indiana's 1970 LOVE sculpture which overlooks the plaza. 

The area has a following in the skate world, as it served as a skateboarding spot for many years.

History
Former Philadelphia city planner Edmund Bacon and architect Vincent G. Kling planned and designed the original LOVE Park. The park is across from the Philadelphia City Hall and serves as a visual terminus for the Benjamin Franklin Parkway.

The park was built in 1965 and covered an underground parking garage. The main feature of the plaza became a centrally-located single spout fountain added in 1969. The city's visitor center (built in 1960, before LOVE Park) was closed for five years, but re-opened in 2006 as The Fairmount Park Welcome Center. The park was dedicated in 1967 as John F. Kennedy Plaza after President John F. Kennedy.

A "LOVE" sculpture, designed by Robert Indiana, was first placed in the plaza in 1976 as part of the  United States Bicentennial celebration. The sculpture was removed in 1978 after the celebration ended. However, the chairman of Philadelphia Art Commission, Fitz Eugene Dixon Jr., was able to purchase the sculpture and to have it permanently placed it in the plaza during that year.

From 2016 to 2018, a major reconstruction project converted the largely hardscaped plaza  into a greener space that contains large and small lawns for casual uses, two gardens and 2 green stormwater basins with tropical and native plantings, an open viewshed of City Hall and the Benjamin Franklin Parkway, new cafe seating, and daily recreational games. A redesigned fountain features a large central jet and a "bird's nest" of smaller jets with programmable up-lighting within a large oval paved area.

See also

List of parks in Philadelphia

References

External links

2004 video documentary about the rise and fall of skateboarding in LOVE Park
Love Park videos and photos from SkateSpotter

Municipal parks in Philadelphia
Skateboarding spots
Center City, Philadelphia
Love